The Museum of Modern Art of Medellín (MAMM, Museo de Arte Moderno de Medellín) is a museum of modern art in the Colombian city of Medellín. It was founded in 1978.

Many artworks by Débora Arango, who was born in Medellín, are part of the museum's collection. Leiko Ikemura had a show at the Museum in 1999.

See also 
 Bogotá Museum of Modern Art

References

External links 
 

Museums in Medellín
Art museums and galleries in Colombia
Modern art museums